Rodney St. Cloud (born December 3, 1973) (age 49) is a retired American professional bodybuilder.

Career
St. Cloud got engaged in the sport of bodybuilding at an early age and he was the overall winner of the Mr. Stevenson High School Championship in 1989. He went on to participate in various National Physique Committee competitions until 1999 when he was the light heavyweight winner at the NPC USA Championships and NPC Nationals, after which he won his IFBB pro card. His first professional event was the 2000 Toronto Pro Supershow where he got the 14th place.

Competition history
Professional
2006 Mr. Olympia - 16th
2006 IFBB Atlantic City Pro - 3rd
2006 IFBB Europa Super Show - 12th
2006 IFBB New York Pro - 8th
2006 IFBB Shawn Ray Colorado Pro - 6th
2006 IFBB Iron Man Pro -NP
2004 IFBB Night Of Champions -16th
2004 IFBB Florida Xtreme Pro Challenge - 16th
2004 IFBB Grand Prix Hungary - 7th
2003 IFBB GNC Show Of Strength - 12th
2003 IFBB Grand Prix Holland - 9th
2003 IFBB Grand Prix England - 9th
2003 Mr. Olympia - 12th
2003 IFBB Grand Prix Russia - 5th
2003 IFBB Grand Prix Hungary - 2nd
2003 IFBB Night Of Champions - 10th
2001 IFBB Night Of Champions - 18th
2001 IFBB Toronto Pro - 15th
2001 IFBB Iron Man Pro - 10th
2000 IFBB Night Of Champions - 18th
2000 IFBB Toronto Pro - 14th

Amateur
1999 NPC USA Championships - Light Heavyweight, 1st
1999 NPC Nationals - Light Heavyweight, 1st
1998 NPC Nationals - Heavyweight, 5th
1998 NPC Junior Nationals - Heavyweight, 1st
1998 NPC Atlantic States Championships - Heavyweight, 1st
1997 NPC Atlantic States Championships - Lightweight, 1st
1996 NPC Junior Nationals - Light Heavyweight, 6th
1996 NPC Atlantic States Championships - Light Heavyweight, 3rd
1993 NPC Teen Nationals - Middleweight, 3rd
1992 NPC New York Metro Championships - Teen, 1st

Personal life
St. Cloud was born in Brooklyn, New York to parents of Haitian origin. The family moved to The Bronx shortly after his birth.

St. Cloud has also been working as an exotic dancer and pornographic actor under the alias "Hot Rod" and he is maintaining the website Strippers in the Hood.

References

External links
Rodney St. Cloud official website
Rodney St. Cloud (Strippers in the Hood) Twitter account 

1973 births
Living people
African-American bodybuilders
American sportspeople of Haitian descent
American male erotic dancers
Professional bodybuilders
Sportspeople from the Bronx
21st-century African-American sportspeople
20th-century African-American sportspeople